Kanoni, also Kanoni, Gomba or Kanoni–Gomba, is a town in the Central Region of Uganda. It is the commercial, administrative, and political headquarters of Gomba District.

Location
The coordinates of Kanoni are 0°10'22.0"N, 31°54'21.0"E (Latitude:0.172778; Longitude:31.905833).

Population
During the national population census and household survey, conducted on 27 August 2014, the population of Kanoni was enumerated at 12,439 people.

Points of interest
The following points of interest lie within the town limits or close to the edges of town include the tarmacked Mpigi–Kabulasoke–Maddu–Sembabule Road, which passes through town, between Gombe and Kabulasoke.

The offices of Kanoni Town Council and the headquarters of Gomba District Administration are located in the town. A new radio station, (Gomba FM), started broadcasting in 2018, and Mubiru Motel, offers accommodation and meals.

Kanoni has one public health care facility, Kanoni Health Centre III, one pharmacy and a number of drug shops, where those who can afford the cost, can obtain medication for their ailments.

The town is home to several elementary schools, most of them private, and two secondary schools. There are four coffee processing factories in the town and one plastics manufacturing factory, Kanoni Plastic Works Company Limited (not operating as of September 2018).

Notable people 
 Robert Kyagulanyi Ssentamu

See also
 Butambala District
 Sembabule District
 The Equator
 List of cities and towns in Uganda

References

 
Populated places in Central Region, Uganda
Gomba District